Two solar eclipses occurred during 1919:
The total solar eclipse of May 29, 1919, used for a famous experiment demonstrating general relativity
The annular solar eclipse of November 22, 1919